MKK is mitogen-activated protein kinase kinase, an enzyme.

MKK may also refer to:
 
Malmö KK, Swedish swim team from Malmö
Main-Kinzig-Kreis, a kreis (district) in Hesse, Germany
MKK, the IATA Airport code for Molokai Airport on the  island of Molokai, Hawaii
Mong Kok East station, Hong Kong; MTR station code MKK
Museum für Kunst und Kulturgeschichte in Dortmund, Germany
The Morgan-Keenan-Kellman system, a stellar classification system also known as Yerkes spectral classification